Idényt (Danish: New Ideas) is a Danish language lifestyle magazine freely distributed to households. The magazine has been included in the Guinness Book of Records as the world's largest free magazine. It has existed since 1978.

History and profile
Idényt was established in 1978. The founding publisher of the magazine is  Kai Dige Bach A/S. In 2002 Bonnier Group acquired 50 % of its publisher, the Benjamin Media. In 2009 Bonnier Group fully acquired both the publisher and the magazine.

Previously Idényt was published on a quarterly basis. Later its frequency was switched to ten times per year and the magazine has eight different versions. It has its headquarters in Frederiksberg, and offers articles about home and garden. Gitte Højbjerg is the director of sales of the magazine.

In 2001 Idényt had a circulation of 2,517,000 copies, making it the fifth largest special interest magazine worldwide.

See also
 List of magazines in Denmark

References

External links
Official website

1978 establishments in Denmark
Bonnier Group
Danish-language magazines
Free magazines
Lifestyle magazines
Magazines established in 1978
Magazines published in Copenhagen
Quarterly magazines published in Denmark
Ten times annually magazines